The 2008 Sam Houston State Bearkats football team represented Sam Houston State University as a member of the Southland Conference during the 2008 NCAA Division I FCS football season. Led by fourth-year head coach Todd Whitten, the Bearkats compiled an overall record of 4–6 with a mark of 2–5 in conference play, and finished tied for sixth in the Southland.

Schedule

References

Sam Houston State
Sam Houston Bearkats football seasons
Sam Houston State Bearkats football